I'm All Smiles is a live album by pianists Tommy Flanagan and Hank Jones recorded in Germany in 1983 for the MPS label.

Reception

Allmusic awarded the album 4 stars, stating: "The two pianists have the kind of feel for one another's playing that avoids the crash of egos and instead inspires the give and take necessary for each performance to reach its full potential".

Track listing
 "Relaxin' at Camarillo" (Charlie Parker) - 5:20
 "In a Sentimental Mood" (Duke Ellington, Manny Kurtz, Irving Mills) - 7:37
 "Some Day My Prince Will Come" (Frank Churchill, Larry Morey) - 6:54
 "Afternoon in Paris" (John Lewis) - 4:29
 "Au Privave" (Parker) - 6:20
 "I'm All Smiles" (Michael Leonard, Herbert Martin) - 5:04
 "Rockin' in Rhythm" (Harry Carney, Ellington, Mills) - 4:47
 "Con Alma" (Dizzy Gillespie) - 6:46

Personnel 
Hank Jones - Steinway Concert Grand Piano (tracks 5-8), Bösendorfer Imperial Concert Grand Piano (tracks 1-4)
Tommy Flanagan - Steinway Concert Grand Piano (tracks 1-4), Bösendorfer Imperial Concert Grand Piano (tracks 5-8)

References 

1984 live albums
Tommy Flanagan live albums
Hank Jones live albums
MPS Records live albums